Carlotta is a Danish, Finnish, German, Italian, Norwegian, Spanish, and Swedish feminine given name and a feminine form of Carlos and Carlo. Notable people known by this name include the following:

Given name

Carlotta (performer) (born 1943), Australian theatre and television personality
Carlotta, the Lady Aeronaut, professional name of Mary Myers (1849–1932), American professional balloonist
Carlotta Addison (1849–1914), English actress
Carlotta Adele Anderson (1876–1956), American educator
Carlotta Barilli (1935–2020), Italian actress
Carlotta Berry, American academic in the field of engineering
Carlotta Brianza (1867–1930), Italian prima ballerina
Carlotta Brunelli (born 1993), Italian female weightlifter
Carlotta Cambi (born 1996), Italian volleyball
Carlotta Case Hall (1880–1949), American botanist
Carlotta Corpron (1901–1988), American photographer
Carlotta de Bevilacqua, Italian architect, designer and entrepreneur
Carlotta Fedeli (born 1992), Italian racing driver
Carlotta Ferlito (born 1995), Italian artistic gymnast
Carlotta Ferrari (1837–1907), Italian composer
Carlotta Freeman (c.1877–1954), American actress
Carlotta Gall British journalist and writer for The New York Times
Carlotta Giovannini (born 1990), Italian artistic gymnast
Carlotta Grisi (1819–1899), Italian ballet dancer
Carlotta Ikeda, born Sanae Ikeda, (1941–2014), Japanese dancer
Carlotta Minna Labowsky, known as Lotte Labowsky (1905–1991), Jewish German classicist 
Carlotta Leclercq (1838–1893), British actress
Carlotta Maury (1874–1938), American scientist
Carlotta Maggiorana (born 1992), Italian actress and beauty queen (Miss Italia 2018)
Carlotta Marchisio (1835–1872), Italian operatic soprano
Carlotta Mercedes Agnes McCambridge, known as Mercedes McCambridge (1916–2004), American actress
Carlotta Montanari, Italian film actress and TV host
Carlotta Monterey, whose birthname was Hazel Neilson Taasinge, (1888–1970), American actress
Carlotta Monti (1907–1993), film actress and mistress of W. C. Fields
Carlotta Natoli (born 1971), Italian actress
Carlotta Nillson (1876–1951), Swedish-born American actress
Carlotta Nobile (1988–2013), Italian art historian, violinist, writer, and artistic director
Carlotta Patti (c. 1840 – 1889), Italian operatic soprano 
Carlotta Perry (1839–1914),  American poet
Carlotta Petrina (1901–1997), American illustrator and printer
Carlotta Ida Popert (1848 – 1923, German-Italian artist
Carlotta Provin, birthname of Dina De Santis (born 1943), Italian actress
Carlotta Tagnin (born 1965), Italian swimmer 
Carlotta Thompkins, also known as Lottie Deno (1844–1934), American gambler
Carlotta Truman (born 1999), German singer-songwriter
Carlotta Valdes (disambiguation)
Carlotta Walls LaNier (1942), the first black female to graduate from Central High School, Little Rock, Arkansas
Carlotta Zambelli (1875–1968), Italian ballerina
Carlotta Zofkova (born 1993), Italian swimmer

Fictional characters
Carlotta Beck, in the television sitcom Filthy Rich
Carlotta Giudicelli, in the novel and musical The Phantom of the Opera
Carlotta Nardi, in the 1918 opera Die Gezeichneten by Franz Schreker
Carlotta Ulansky, in the novel Youth in Revolt
Carlotta Valdes, mentioned in the 1958 Alfred Hitchcock film Vertigo
Carlotta Vega, in the American soap opera One Life to Live
Sister Carlotta, in the Ender's Game novel series
Carlotta, in the 1989 film The Little Mermaid, its sequel and the 2007 stage musical
Carlotta Brown, character in the St Clare's series by Enid Blyton
Carlotta Wren, main character in mystery series Body Movers by Stephanie Bond
Carlotta Casagrande, character in American animated series The Casagrandes

See also

Carl Otto
Carlota (name)
Carlotto (name)
Charlotta

Notes

Given names
Danish feminine given names
Finnish feminine given names
German feminine given names
Italian feminine given names
Norwegian feminine given names
Spanish feminine given names
Swedish feminine given names